RADCAL (short for RADar CALibration Satellite) was a radar calibration satellite launched and operated by the United States Air Force. It was active from June 1993 until it stopped communicating in May 2013.

Design

Construction 
RADCAL was built by Defense Systems Inc. as United States Air Force Space Test Program payload P92-1. It was built under a one-year contract-to-launch and cost $10 million.

Components 
Payload included two C Band transponders (operating at the same frequency as space-detection radars), a Doppler beacon that transmitted at 150 and 400 MHz, and a pair of modified Trimble Inc. TANS Quadrex Global Positioning System receivers. The receivers were used to determine the satellite's orbit as a reference for calibrating space detection radars. It also carried the Small Satellite Power System Regulator, an experiment testing improved battery charging on solar panel-equipped vehicles.

Mission

Launch 
RADCAL launched into polar orbit at 23:30:00 UTC on 25 June 1993 from Vandenberg Air Force Base's Space Launch Complex 5. The launch vehicle was Scout S217C.

Operation 
RADCAL was used to calibrate ground-based space tracking radars: they would track it and compare their estimated position to its true position. By the end of its operational lifetime, it was one of only two functional radar performance monitoring satellites (along with DMSP F-15) and was actively used by a number of civilian and military organizations. Its GPS receivers were used in experiments to determine its attitude in space. It was the first satellite to use a GPS to determine its attitude. RADCAL was designed to last for three years, but remained operational until May 2013.

References 

Spacecraft launched in 1993
Space radars
USA satellites
Radar calibration satellites